Bandera Roja ('Red Flag') was a newspaper published from Tupiza, Bolivia. The newspaper appeared in 1947. The publication of the newspaper was irregular. Augusto Arroyo Z. was the director of Bandera Roja. It was printed at Imprenta "La Popular".

References

1947 establishments in Bolivia
Spanish-language newspapers
Newspapers published in Bolivia
Publications established in 1947